Black Joy may refer to:
 Black Joy (album), a video album by Psychic TV
 Black Joy (film), a 1977 British film